Members of the genus Metridium, also known as plumose anemones, are sea anemones found mostly in the cooler waters of the northern Pacific and Atlantic oceans.  They are characterized by their numerous threadlike tentacles extending from atop a smooth cylindrical column, and can vary from a few centimeters in height up to one meter or more.  In larger specimens, the oral disk becomes densely curved and frilly.

Species
The following species are recognised in the World Register of Marine Species (WoRMS):

Metridium canum Stuckey, 1914
Metridium dianthus Ellis, 1768
Metridium exile Hand, 1956
Metridium farcimen (Tilesius, 1809) – giant plumose anemone or white-plumed anemone
Metridium huanghaiensis Pei, 1998
Metridium senile (Linnaeus, 1761) – frilled anemone
Metridium sinensis Pei, 1998

References

External links
Videos of the Metridium Fields in Monterey, CA
Photos
ITIS Listing

Metridiidae
Hexacorallia genera